Graphisurus triangulifer is a species of longhorn beetles of the subfamily Lamiinae. It was described by Haldeman in 1847, and is known from the eastern United States, as well as the central state of Texas.

References

Beetles described in 1847
Acanthocinini